Silvio Warsönke is an East German Olympic javelin thrower. He represented his country in the men's javelin throw at the 1988 Summer Olympics. His distance was a 78.22.

References

1967 births
Living people
East German male javelin throwers
Olympic athletes of East Germany
Athletes (track and field) at the 1988 Summer Olympics
People from Finsterwalde
Sportspeople from Brandenburg